Senator Muse may refer to:

Benjamin Muse (1898–1986), Virginia State Senate
C. Anthony Muse (born 1958), Maryland State Senate
Leonard G. Muse (1897–1994), Virginia State Senate